NEEI is the sixth album by Masami Okui, released on August 23, 2000.

Track listing
Just Do It (NEEI mix)
 Lyrics: Masami Okui
 Composition, arrangement: Toshiro Yabuki
M.M Family
 Lyrics: Masami Okui
 Composition: Toshiro Yabuki
 Arrangement: Masato Yamada, Toshiro Yabuki
Cutie
 Anime television series Di Gi Charat Summer Special 2000 opening song
 Lyrics: Masami Okui
 Composition, arrangement: Toshiro Yabuki
Turning Point (L.A version)
 Lyrics: Masami Okui
 Composition, arrangement: Toshiro Yabuki
Sunrise Sunset
 Lyrics, composition: Masami Okui
 Arrangement: Itaru Watanabe
Over the End
 Lyrics: Masami Okui
 Composition, arrangement: Toshiro Yabuki

 Lyrics: Masami Okui
 Composition: Toshiro Yabuki
 Arrangement: Hideki Satou
Chaos
 Lyrics, composition: Masami Okui
 Arrangement: Hideki Satou

 Lyrics: Masami Okui
 Composition, arrangement: Tsutomu Ohira
Moon
 Lyrics, composition: Masami Okui
 Arrangement: Hideki Satou

 Lyrics: Masami Okui
 Composition, arrangement: Toshiro Yabuki

 Lyrics, composition: Masami Okui
 Arrangement: Tsutomu Ohira
eternal promise (version 091)
 Lyrics: Masami Okui
 Composition: Masami Okui, Toshiro Yabuki
 Arrangement: Masami Okui
Only One, No. 1
 Anime television series Di Gi Charat opening song
 Lyrics: Masami Okui
 Composition, arrangement: Toshiro Yabuki

Sources
Official website: Makusonia

2000 albums
Masami Okui albums